Ivano-Frankivsk Raion is a raion (district) of Ivano-Frankivsk Oblast, Ukraine. It was created in July 2020 as part of the reform of administrative divisions of Ukraine. The center of the raion is the city of Ivano-Frankivsk. Five abolished raions, Bohorodchany, Halych, Rohatyn, Tlumach, and Tysmenytsia Raions, as well as Ivano-Frankivsk and Burshtyn Municipalities, were merged into Ivano-Frankivsk Raion. Population:

Subdivisions
At the time of establishment, the raion consisted of 20 hromadas:
 Bilshivtsi settlement hromada with the administration in the urban-type settlement of Bilshivtsi, transferred from Halych Raion;
 Bohorodchany settlement hromada with the administration in the urban-type settlement of Bohorodchany, transferred from Bohorodchany Raion;
 Bukachivtsi settlement hromada with the administration in the urban-type settlement of Bukachivtsi, transferred from Rohatyn Raion;
 Burshtyn urban hromada with the administration in the city of Burshtyn, transferred from Burshtyn Municipality;
 Dubivtsi rural hromada with the administration in the selo of Dubivtsi, transferred from Halych Raion;
 Dzvyniach rural hromada with the administration in the selo of Dzvyniach, transferred from Bohorodchany Raion;
 Halych urban hromada with the administration in the city of Halych, transferred from Halych Raion;
 Ivano-Frankivsk urban hromada with the administration in the city of Ivano-Frankivsk, transferred from Ivano-Frankivsk Municipality;
 Lysets settlement hromada with the administration in the urban-type settlement of Lysets, transferred from Tysmenytsia Raion;
 Obertyn settlement hromada with the administration in the urban-type settlement of Obertyn, transferred from Tlumach Raion;
 Olesha rural hromada with the administration in the selo of Olesha, transferred from Tlumach Raion;
 Rohatyn urban hromada with the administration in the city of Rohatyn, transferred from Rohatyn Raion;
 Solotvyn settlement hromada with the administration in the urban-type settlement of Solotvyn, transferred from Bohorodchany Raion;
 Stari Bohorodchany rural hromada with the administration in the selo of Stari Bohorodchany, transferred from Bohorodchany Raion;
 Tlumach urban hromada with the administration in the city of Tlumach, transferred from Tlumach Raion;
 Tysmenytsia urban hromada with the administration in the city of Tysmenytsia, transferred from Tysmenytsia Raion;
 Uhryniv rural hromada with the administration in the selo of Uhryniv, transferred from Tysmenytsia Raion;
 Yamnytsia rural hromada with the administration in the selo of Yamnytsia, transferred from Tysmenytsia Raion;
 Yezupil settlement hromada with the administration in the urban-type settlement of Yezupil, transferred from Tysmenytsia Raion;
 Zahvizdia rural hromada with the administration in the selo of Zahvizdia, transferred from Tysmenytsia Raion.

References

 
Raions of Ivano-Frankivsk Oblast
Ukrainian raions established during the 2020 administrative reform